John Kelvin Roberts, born at Liverpool on 9 October 1949, played first-class and List A cricket for Somerset in the 1969 and 1970 seasons.

A right-handed tail-end batsman and a left-arm medium pace bowler, Roberts was one of several young players brought in by Somerset in the 1969 season – others included Brian Rose and Peter Denning – as the team set out to rebuild after the departure of much of the successful side of the 1960s. Roberts played in six County Championship matches, with his best bowling performance being four for 38 runs against Yorkshire at Headingley, the match in which Greg Chappell also achieved his career-best bowling performance. Roberts had more success in one-day cricket, playing in nine of Somerset's games in the inaugural season of the Sunday league competition; his best performance was four for 18 against Sussex, the match being played at Torquay, the first "home" fixture outside Somerset since the county club was founded, also at Torquay, in 1875.

Wisden in its review of Somerset in 1969 noted Roberts as a promising player: he "displayed a cool head and improved steadily during the year," it said. But in 1970, Somerset recruited other bowlers and Roberts played in only two first-class and two one-day matches, with limited success. He did not appear in the first team after the 1970 season, but remained in the county's second eleven through 1971.

References

1949 births
Living people
English cricketers
Somerset cricketers